Thomas Steele Price (born May 28, 1933) is an American rower who competed in the 1952 Summer Olympics.

He was born in Long Branch, New Jersey. In 1952, he won the gold medal with his partner Charlie Logg in the coxless pairs event.

References 
 

1933 births
Living people
American male rowers
Rowers at the 1952 Summer Olympics
Olympic gold medalists for the United States in rowing
Sportspeople from Long Branch, New Jersey
Medalists at the 1952 Summer Olympics
Pan American Games medalists in rowing
Pan American Games silver medalists for the United States
Rowers at the 1955 Pan American Games
Sportspeople from Monmouth County, New Jersey
Storm King School alumni